Skavabölen pojat (Finnish for "the boys from Skavaböle/Hyrylä") is a 2009 Finnish drama film. It was directed by Zaida Bergroth and based on a play by the same name, written by Antti Raivio in 1991 and performed at Q-teatteri in the 1990s. Skavabölen pojat is a story about two brothers, growing from children to adults, from the early 1970s to the early 1980s, in Grankulla/Grankulla/Kauniainen and Skavaböle/Hyrylä in the Greater Helsinki Area.

The film was awarded the Flash Forward prize at the Busan International Film Festival in South Korea.

Plot
The film varies between the "present" in the early 1980s, and the brothers' childhood in the early 1970s.

Cast
 Ilmari Järvenpää as Rupert Kallio 
 Onni Tommila as Evert
 Lauri Tilkanen
 Iiro Panula
 Leea Klemola (mother)
 Martti Suosalo (father)
 Elina Knihtilä
 Tommi Korpela
 Sulevi Peltola
 Henriikka Salo
 Eila Roine

Reception
In the film review column in the Helsingin Sanomat weekly supplement Nyt, four critics gave the film an average score of 3.3 out of 5.

References

External links
 
 Jonni Aromaa: "Skavabölen pojat finally made into a film", Yleisradio

2009 films
2009 drama films
2000s Finnish-language films
Finnish drama films